Craugastor punctariolus is a species of frog in the family Craugastoridae.
It is endemic to Panama.
Its natural habitats are subtropical or tropical moist montane forests, rivers, and intermittent rivers.
It is threatened by habitat loss.

References

punctariolus
Amphibians described in 1863
Taxa named by Wilhelm Peters
Taxonomy articles created by Polbot